Anthony R. T. Golez Jr. (born September 9, 1972) is a Filipino politician and the current representative of Malasakit at Bayanihan Foundation party-list group in the House of Representatives of the Philippines. He previously served as the representative for the Lone District of Bacolod City in 2010. Prior to that, he was the Presidential Spokesperson at the Office of the President in 2009. He was also the senior deputy press secretary at the Office of the President in 2008, senior deputy presidential spokesperson and undersecretary at the Office of the President in 2007, and the government spokesperson for disaster management at the National Disaster Coordinating Council in 2005 in which his work led him to being named him as one of "The Outstanding Men of the Philippines" in 2007.

Congressional career
As the representative of the Lone District of Bacolod in 2010, he voted against the passing of the Reproductive Health Bill and took the side of the Catholic Church. In 2011, he signed the impeachment complaint against Chief Justice Renato Corona. And in 2012, Golez filed a resolution that urged then President Benigno Aquino III, the Cultural Center of the Philippines (CPP), and the National Commission for Culture and the Arts to bestow the National Artist award to Nora Aunor for her "contributions to Philippine Arts".

As the representative of the Malasakit at Bayanihan Foundation party-list group, he filed House Bill No. 1709 to propose a measure that would make vote-buying a heinous crime and be punishable with jail time. He also filed House Bill No. 6029 that standardizes wage and benefits for rescue workers.

Personal life
Golez is a physician. His first wife, former Tawi-tawi representative Soraya Jaafar-Golez, filed for the annulment of their marriage in September 2012. Jaafar also requested a temporary protection order from the Regional Trial Court for Quezon City in 2012 against her husband to keep him away from her and their daughter at their house in Bacolod.

References 

Filipino political people
1972 births

Living people
Party-list members of the House of Representatives of the Philippines
Members of the House of Representatives of the Philippines from Bacolod